Telodih is a census town in the Giridih CD block in the Giridih Sadar subdivision of  the Giridih district in the Indian state of Jharkhand.

Geography

Location                

Area overview
Giridih district is a part of the Chota Nagpur plateau, with rocky soil and extensive forests. Most of the rivers in the district flow from the west to east, except in the northern portion where the rivers flow north and north west. The district has coal and mica mines. It is an overwhelmingly rural district with small pockets of urbanisation.

Note: The map alongside presents some of the notable locations in the district. All places marked in the map are linked in the larger full screen map.

Demographics
According to the 2011 Census of India, Telodih had a total population of 6,970, of which 3,626 (52%) were males and 3,344 (48%) were females. Population in the age range 0–6 years was 1,590. The total number of literate persons in Telodih was 3,224 (59.93% of the population over 6 years).

Infrastructure
According to the District Census Handbook 2011, Giridih, Telodih covered an area of 1.6 km2. Among the civic amenities, it had 10 km roads with open drains, the protected water supply involved uncovered well, hand pump. It had 972 domestic electric connections, 5 road light points. Among the educational facilities it had 7 primary schools, 1 middle school, other educational facilities at Giridih 10 km away.

Transport
Salaia railway station, located nearby, is on the Madhupur-Giridih-Koderma line.

References

Cities and towns in Giridih district